Habersham is an unincorporated community in Habersham County, in the U.S. state of Georgia.

History
Past variant names have included "Bert", "Habersham Mill Village", "Habersham Mills", "Porters Mill Town", and "Porters Mills". The community was named for Colonel Joseph Habersham of the Continental Army in the Revolutionary War.

References

Unincorporated communities in Habersham County, Georgia
Unincorporated communities in Georgia (U.S. state)